KFXZ-FM (105.9 MHz, "Z 105.9") is a radio station licensed to serve Opelousas, Louisiana.  The station is owned by Charles Chatelain, through licensee Delta Media Corporation. It airs an urban adult contemporary format.  KFXZ's studios are located on Evangeline Thruway in Carencro, and its transmitter is located south of Opelousas.

The station was assigned the KFXZ-FM call letters by the Federal Communications Commission on March 4, 2007.

History
The station started out as an Alternative Rock station, but was later replaced as an easy listening jazz station.
The station had been broadcasting a classic country format until November 4, 2008, when the format was changed to Urban AC. The new format featured the syndicated Tom Joyner Morning Show.

On October 28, 2012, KFXZ-FM changed their format from urban AC to country, branded as "Cat Country 105.9".

On May 1, 2013, KFXZ-FM changed their format back to urban AC, branded as "Z 105.9".  The station also broadcast over the air on KLWB DT4.

References

External links

Radio stations in Louisiana
Opelousas, Louisiana
Mass media in Lafayette, Louisiana
Urban adult contemporary radio stations in the United States